Poecilocampa is a genus of moths in the family Lasiocampidae first described by Stephens in 1828.

Species
Poecilocampa alpina (Frey & Wullschlevel, 1874) - Millière's December moth 
Poecilocampa populi (Linnaeus, 1758) - December eggar

References

External links
Fauna Europaea

Lasiocampidae